is a Japanese photographer.

Biography 
Michiko Matsumoto was born in Shizuoka Prefecture, Japan, in 1950, and in 1974 graduated  from Hosei University (Tokyo). She is currently based in Tokyo.

The artist's early work of the 1980s included several series of portraits of artists living in various countries and the principal dancers of major dance companies.

She has published 13 books of photography. Her works are in the collections of a number of museums internationally.

Exhibitions

Selected solo exhibitions
 1974 "Yoko Ono in New York" 3points, Tokyo
 1978 "Women Come Alive" Pepe, Tokyo
 1978 "In South East Asia" Hankyu Art Gallery, Osaka
 1981 "Niki de Saint Phalle" Space Niki, Tokyo
 1983 "Portraits of New York Women" Parco Gallery, Tokyo, Sapporo
 1986 "Niki de Saint Phalle" Parco SR6, Tokyo
 1988 "Portraits ~ Women Artists" Soho Photo Gallery, New York U.S.A
 1989 "Portraits of Dancers 1" Gallery Selare, Tokyo
 1990 "Portraits of Women Artists" Keihan Art Gallery, Osaka
 1990–1998 "Portraits of Dancers 2–5" Gallery Selare, Tokyo
 1998 "Dancers" Dentsu Kosan Gallery, Tokyo
 1999 "Nicolas Le Rishe in Paris" Gallery Selare, Tokyo
 2000 "White on White" Heart & Color, Tokyo
 2001 "Ruzimatov in St. Petersburg"  Egg Gallery, Tokyo
 2002 "Homage to Niki de Saint Phalle" Gallery Colorium,Tokyo, Prinz, Kyoto
 2004 "Meditative Body, Awaked City" Gallery 21、Tokyo
 2004 "Sessions" Zeit-Foto Salon, Tokyo
 2005 "Rose Passion" Gallery Colorium, Tokyo
 2007 "Cloths with Soul" Gallery le bain, Tokyo
 2007 "Meditative Body — from St. Petersburg" Gallery Tosei, Tokyo
 2009 "The Name of Roses" Junkudo, Tokyo
 2010 "The Witches Tea Party" (Portraits of Niki de Saint Phalle) Tokinowasuremono, Tokyo
 2013 "Les Femmes Artistes" LIBRAIRIE 6
 2016 "Portraits " The Museum of Contemporary Art Karuizawa, Nagano

Selected group exhibitions
 1987 "Contemporary Japanese Photography" Toured Europe
 1988 "Faces of 20th Century by Distinguished Photographers" Asahi Gallery, Tokyo
 1990 "Women Photographers" Nikon Salon, New York,
 1995 "Objects, faces and Anti-Narratives" Tokyo Metropolitan Museum of Photography
 1998-2000 "Women Photographers from Japan" Toured U.S.A.
 2003 "Mon Paris" Gallery 21, Tokyo
 2006 "Photographs of Kazuo Oono" Fukushima Photo Museum
 2007 "Works from the Photographic Art in Japan" Shanghai Art Museum, China
 2008 "Visions des Artistes Feminines" Gallery 21, Tokyo
 2008 "Esprit de Paris" Gallery 21, Tokyo
 2008 "Vision of America III" Tokyo Metropolitan Museum of Photography
 2010 "Onna Tachidomaranai Jyoseitachi "(Tokyo Metropolitan Museum of Photography)
 2010 "Human Images of 20th Century ~All photographs are portraits~"(Tokyo Metropolitan Museum of Photography)

Publications
 Nobiyaka onna-tachi ) / Women Come Alive. Tokyo: Hanashi no Tokushū-sha, 1978.  Portraits of women
 Michiko Matsumoto Ballet: 5 September 1981. Singapore: National Theatre Trust, 1981. (in English)
 Shōzō Nyūyōku no onna-tachi / Portraits of New York women. Tokyo: Tōjusha, 1983. 
 Ochiai Keiko, Matsumoto Michiko no heya / Série Chambre 4. Tokyo: Ōbunsha, 1985. .  With Keiko Ochiai.
 Niki do Sanfāru / Portrait of Niki de Saint Phalle. Tokyo: Parco, 1986. .   About Niki de Saint Phalle.
 Portraits: Josei ātisto no shōjō / Portraits: Women Artists. Tokyo: Kawade Shobo Shinsha, 1995. . 
 Dancers: Erosu no shōjō. Kodansha, 1998.   Portraits of dancers.
 Portraits: 54-nin no josei ātisto-tachi. Kyoto: Kyōto Shoin, 1999. .  Portraits of 54 women artists.
 Haretara bara hiyori / Rose Passion. Kyoto: Tankōsha, 2005. . 
 Tamashii no nuno: Monsūn-Ajia 12-jin no josei-sakka-tachi.  Tankōsha, 2007. .  Portraits of 12 women artists of "monsoon Asia".
 Yōroppa bara no namae o meguru tabi / The Seven Roses Story. Tokyo: Media Factory, 2009. . 
 "Ｎippon no Ｂara"(Japanese Wild Roses)(日本のバラ）、Tankosha,2012
 "Tokyo Sakura 100 ka "(100 Cherry Blossoms in Tokyo) (東京桜100花）、Tankosha,2015
 "Sarasa" (Printed Cotton in the World) （更紗）、Tankosha,2016

Public collections
 Tokyo Metropolitan Museum of Photography, Tokyo
 Bibliothèque Nationale, Paris
 Museum of Liberty Osaka, Osaka
 Museum of Josei University, Tokyo
 Niki Museum, Nasu, Tochigi
 The National Museum of Modern Art,Tokyo
 The Museum of contemporary Art Karuizawa,Nagano,Karuizawa
 Tokyo Opera City Art Gallery,Tokyo

References

Sources
 Nihon shashinka jiten / 328 Outstanding Japanese Photographers. Kyoto: Tankōsha, 2000. .  Despite the English-language alternative title, all in Japanese.

External links
 Matsumoto's website
 Matsumoto's blog

Japanese photographers
1950 births
Living people
Japanese women photographers
Hosei University alumni
20th-century photographers

20th-century women photographers
21st-century women photographers